Girl/Girl Scene is an American comedy-drama streaming television series. It was created and written by Tucky Williams, who also stars as Evan, a sexually promiscuous, androgynous, lesbian. The first episode premiered on Blip (now defunct), on September 6, 2010, and the last episode premiered on January 5, 2015. The story features several LGBT women struggling with romantic relationships. The series now airs on Amazon Video.

Cast 
Tucky Williams as Evan
 Katie Stewart as Maxine
 Joe Elswick as Jessie
 Cyndy Allen as Susan
 Jackson E. Cofer as Elliott
 Kayden Kross as Avery
 Roni Jonah as Trista
 David Haney as Dan
 Santana Berry as Tyler
 Joe Gatton as Mike
 Caitlyn Kogge as Hayley
 Thomas J. Phillips as Todd
 Abisha Uhl as Bender
 Eric Butts as Tomas
Lauren Albert as Ling

Reception 
The show has received mixed reviews; Autostraddle, an online magazine, said that one of the main criticisms of Girl/Girl Scene is its "lackluster acting", further commenting that "the writing could be a little sharper, too." Those details, however, "don’t detract from the excitement of watching your own [lesbian] community."

The series has been compared to the Showtime LGBT television series The L Word.

Film 
A film based on the series, entitled Girl/Girl Scene - The Movie, was released in 2019.

References

External links
Girl/Girl Scene on YouTube

Girl/Girl Scene on Amazon Video

2010s American LGBT-related drama television series
Lesbian-related television shows
American LGBT-related web series